The Naked Ape is a 1973 American comedy film, loosely adapted from the non-fiction book of the same name by Desmond Morris, written and directed by Donald Driver, and starring Johnny Crawford, Victoria Principal, Dennis Olivieri, Diana Darrin, Norman Grabowski, and John Hillerman, with animated segments created by Murakami Wolf Studios. The film was released on August 1, 1973, by Universal Pictures.

The Desmond Morris book had been optioned for a film adaptation in 1968, and aside from some factual consultation, Morris was not involved in the screenplay writing. Initially set up at Universal, after initial screenplay drafts were submitted, the book was deemed unfilmable and was almost sent into turnaround, until Playboy magazine founder Hugh Hefner, who had been producing other film projects at the time, agreed to co-finance the project.

Leading lady Victoria Principal later said that her career momentum was hurt by the film's failure.

Plot
In a series of satirical live action and animated vignettes, the evolution of humanity is depicted and explored, primarily through the experiences of Cathy, a tour guide in a natural history museum describing the ages of mankind and its advancement, and Lee, a college student who meets Cathy in one of his classes and grows infatuated with her. Through them, rituals of courtship, sex, marriage, workplace manners, and military service are dramatized, suggesting that despite centuries of change, certain behaviors remain constant.

Cast 
 Johnny Crawford as Lee
 Victoria Principal as Cathy
 Dennis Olivieri as Arnie
 Diana Darrin as Fat Woman
 Norman Grabowski as Sargent
 John Hillerman as Psychiatrist
 Helen Horowitz as Fat Child
 Robert Ito as Samurai Warrior
 Marvin Miller as Fat Man

References

External links
 
 
 Shock Cinema Magazine: The Naked Ape

1973 films
1973 comedy films
American comedy films
Playboy Productions films
Universal Pictures films
1970s English-language films
1970s American films